The Gazette van Detroit ("Gazette of Detroit") was a Flemish newspaper in Dutch and English, published in the United States since 13 August 1914. It was aimed at Flemish immigrants and their descendants living in the United States and Canada, but latterly also some subscribers in Europe. Its parent company was a 501(c)(3) U.S. Internal Revenue Service recognized non-profit called Belgian Publishing Inc. Its final chairman was David Baeckelandt. The newspaper was published by "Belgian Publishing Inc." at 18740 13 Mile Road in Roseville, Michigan.

The Gazette van Detroit first appeared as a weekly newspaper, later it became bi-weekly, and finally monthly. It had become an online-only paper before its ultimate demise. It was the longest lasting Belgian American newspaper, outlasting the Gazette van Moline at Moline, Illinois (1907–40). The newspaper's original mission statement, published in an article entitled "The Light for the People" (Het Licht voor 't Volk) set forward the newspaper's aim:

By 2004, celebrating its ninetieth birthday, it was still a popular newspaper among North Americans of Flemish ancestry and their relatives in Belgium. In 2006, the Flemish Government donated 12,500 euro to ensure the Gazette van Detroit could continue its operations. The newspaper finally folded in 2018.

The Gazette van Detroit and it's parent, The Belgian Publishing Company, ceased publishing and operation on December 31, 2018. All content and holdings have been transferred to Genealogical Society of Flemish Americans (GSFA).

References

Further reading

External links

A short biographical note about Camille Cools, the founder of the newspaper
 Historic research about the Gazette
14 March 2006 the external affairs commission of the Flemish Parliament discussed whether subsidies should be granted to the Gazette:
 Commission talks report at the website of the Flemish Parliament: PDF - HTML
 VRT news website flandersnews.be
 2 November 2006: Gazette van Detroit seeks photos
 12 December 2006: Gazette van Detroit
The Gazette van Detroit at Flanders' House

Defunct newspapers published in Michigan
Belgian-American culture in Michigan
Dutch-American culture in Michigan
Dutch-language newspapers published in the United States
Flemish American
Non-English-language newspapers published in Michigan
1914 establishments in Michigan
2018 disestablishments in Michigan